Callidula sakuni is a moth of the  family Callidulidae. It is found in Sundaland, Burma and Thailand.

Subspecies
Callidula sakuni sakuni (Sundaland)
Callidula sakuni minor (Moore, 1879) (Burma, Thailand)

References

Callidulidae
Moths described in 1828